Batman: Year One is an American comic book  story arc written by Frank Miller and illustrated by David Mazzucchelli. Year One was originally published by DC Comics in Batman #404–407 in 1987. There have been several reprints of the story: a hardcover, multiple trade paperbacks, several deluxe editions in hardcover and paperback format, and an absolute edition. Year One was also adapted into an animated feature in 2011, after efforts to adapt it into live-action following the failure of 1997's Batman & Robin didn't pan out.

The story recounts Batman's first year as a crime-fighter as well as exploring the life of recently transferred Gotham police detective James Gordon – eventually building towards their first encounter and their eventual alliance against Gotham's criminal underworld.

Publication history

Development
In an effort to resolve continuity errors in the DC Universe, Marv Wolfman and George Pérez produced the 12-issue limited series Crisis on Infinite Earths. Wolfman's plans for the DC Universe after Crisis on Infinite Earths included relaunching every DC comic with a new first issue.

During the production of Crisis on Infinite Earths, Frank Miller was the writer of Marvel Comics' Daredevil. He collaborated with artist David Mazzucchelli to produce Daredevil: Born Again together which was critically acclaimed. Miller later on worked for DC and produced the influential four-issue limited series Batman: The Dark Knight Returns (1986). Editor Dennis O'Neil also moved to work for DC.

The contract Miller signed to produce Dark Knight Returns also required him to write a revamped Batman origin story. Miller's past projects overwhelmed him since he had to handle both writing and illustration duties simultaneously. For Year One, he simply wrote the story and the script, with Mazzucchelli signed on to illustrate the artwork. The team also consisted of Mazzucchelli's wife Richmond Lewis who was in charge of coloring, Todd Klein as the story's letterer, and O'Neil editing the overall story. According to O'Neil, the contract Miller and Mazzucchelli signed to produce Year One in the ongoing Batman series guaranteed publication within 6 months.

Year One was originally conceived as a graphic novel. O'Neil, who had been asked to edit several issues of Batman, was friends with Miller and was able to learn of the story. Reflecting on poor sales of Batman, O'Neil caught Miller one day while on a walk in Los Angeles and convinced him and Mazzucchelli to serialize the story in the ongoing series. Miller was initially reluctant; he felt this would be hard because he had to ensure the story stayed canonical to the DC Universe, something he did not have to worry about when writing Batman: The Dark Knight Returns. In addition, Miller's pacing would have to be altered because of ongoing series' relatively small page counts. O'Neil reasoned that Crisis on Infinite Earths had completely remade the DC Universe, so Miller would be able to have the same creative freedom that Dark Knight Returns provided. He also reassured Miller that he and Mazzucchelli "weren't going to lose anything" by serializing it.

Miller has said he kept Bob Kane and Bill Finger's basic story for Year One but expanded it. In writing the story, Miller looked for parts of Batman's origin that were never explored. He left the core elements, such as the murder of Bruce's parents, intact, but reduced them to brief flashbacks. Bruce's globe-trotting adventures were removed, as Miller found them uninteresting. Rather than portraying Batman as a larger-than-life icon as he had in The Dark Knight Returns, Miller chose to characterize Batman in Year One as an average, inexperienced man trying to make a change in society because Miller believed a superhero is least interesting when most effective. Examples of this include Batman underestimating his opponents, getting shot by police, and his costume being too big. The story's violence was kept street-level and gritty, emphasizing noir and realism.

In illustrating, Mazzucchelli sought to make Year One look grimy, dark, and muted. His interpretation of Gotham City was designed to symbolize corruption, featuring muddy colors that gave the impression of the city being dirty and needing a hero. The newsprint paper used in Batman was unable to reproduce the bright coloring and visual effects of Dark Knight Returns, so Mazzucchelli took on Year One with a more grounded and darker approach.

Publication
In accordance with Wolfman's plans, O'Neil initially saw "Year One" as the start of the second volume of Batman and expected the first part to be its first issue. However, Miller rejected this idea. He explained: "I don't need to slash through continuity with a sharp blade as I thought. Doing The Dark Knight Returns has shown me there's been enough good material... I didn't feel that fleshing out an unknown part of Batman's history justified wiping out 50 years of [adventures]." Thus, the four "Year One" issues bear no continuity to past issues of Batman.

Collected editions

According to Mazzucchelli, Year One was designed to be a graphic novel without advertisement pages. In 1988, DC finally gave the approval to publish Year One as a graphic novel in trade paperback and hardcover, containing 96 pages. Due to the different visual quality printed on the paper of the graphic novel, Lewis subsequently recolored the entire story with a new color palette since the four-issue comic books were originally printed on newsprint paper. Both Warner Books and Titan Books also published trade paperbacks in 1988.

In 1989, Longmeadow Press published "The Complete Frank Miller Batman", collecting Year One, Wanted: Santa Claus - Dead or Alive!, and The Dark Knight Returns.

In April 2005, DC released the "Deluxe Edition" of Year One in hardcover and trade paperback to coincide with the release of Batman Begins. This edition reuses the story pages from the 1988 graphic novel with Mazzucchelli supplying the promotional and unseen Batman art, Lewis' color samples, some of the original penciled artwork, and some pages of the original script as bonus materials. The cover was designed by Mazzucchelli and Chip Kidd.

The hardcover deluxe edition was re-released in 2012. Mazzucchelli clarified that he was not contacted by DC to get involved with this edition. Having been sent a copy of the book by DC, Mazzucchelli was unhappy with the quality and opined that "Anybody who's already paid for [the book] should send it back to DC and demand a refund.". He described the re-release as having "thrown all [his] work [on the 2005 release] in the garbage", citing the redesigned cover, recolored artwork, the "shiny paper" used, and the printing of the color "from corrupted, out-of-focus digital files" as points of contention.

In November 2014, to celebrate Batman's 75th anniversary, DC released a sample of Year One as a part of its DC Comics Essentials line of promotional comics. 

In 2015, DC released a hardcover of Year One which included its 2011 animated film adaptation on both DVD and Blu-ray.

In November 2016, DC released a 288-page Absolute Edition of Year One. This edition comes in a slipcase with two hardcover books. Book One features a whole new scanning from the original sketches by Mazzucchelli and remastered coloring by Lewis, while Book Two features scans using pages from the original 1987 issues. Over 60 pages of bonus materials are also included, including Miller's complete scripts in Book Two.

In 2017, the hardcover deluxe edition was re-released again, this time with the same paper quality and coloring as Book One of the 2016 Absolute Edition.

In March 2022, to coincide with the release of The Batman, DC released The Batman Box Set, collecting trade paperbacks of Year One, The Long Halloween, and Ego and Other Tails in a slipcase with art by Jim Lee. Director Matt Reeves cited the three graphic novels as the major influences for the film.

Plot
Billionaire Bruce Wayne returns home to Gotham City after 12 years abroad, training for his eventual one-man war against crime. James Gordon moves to Gotham City with his wife, Barbara Gordon, after a transfer from Chicago. Both are swiftly acquainted with the corruption and violent atmosphere of the city. Gordon tries to focus on purging corruption from the Gotham City Police Department after witnessing his partner, Detective Arnold John Flass, abuse his power as a cop. Unfortunately, several officers led by Flass beat him on orders from his corrupt superior, Commissioner Gillian Loeb. In revenge, Gordon tracks Flass down, beats him, and leaves him naked and handcuffed in the snow.

Bruce believes he is still unprepared to fight against crime despite having the skills he learned abroad. He goes in disguise on a surveillance mission in Gotham's red-light district, but is reluctantly drawn into a brawl with several prostitutes, Holly Robinson and Selina Kyle. Two police officers shoot Bruce on sight and take him away in their patrol car. Bruce breaks free, flees from the scene, and returns to Wayne Manor barely alive. He sits before his father's bust, requesting guidance in his war against crime. A bat suddenly crashes through a window and settles on the bust, inspiring him to save Gotham as Batman. 

Crimes significantly decline after weeks of Bruce striking as Batman. He even goes after Flass, who is in the middle of accepting a bribe from Jefferson Skeevers, a drug dealer of Carmine Falcone. Batman interrupts a dinner party held at the mansion of Gotham's mayor and announces that everyone in the party shall be brought to justice for their crimes someday. Infuriated by Batman's threats, Loeb orders Gordon and GCPD Sergeant Sarah Essen to arrest him. The two cops later come across a runaway truck that nearly hits an old lady. Batman manages to save the lady's life while Gordon stops the truck. Batman then flees into an abandoned building which Loeb orders a bomb dropped on. He also sends in a SWAT team led by a trigger-happy commander, Branden, to kill any survivors left in the building. Batman uses a signal device to attract a swarm of bats from the Batcave as his only route to escape. After witnessing Batman in action, Selina is inspired to don a costume of her own and begin a life of crime. 

Gordon and Essen have a brief affair together and spend two months dating. She, however, chooses to leave Gotham upon learning he is going to be the father of Barbara's child. Gordon is left alone to investigate Bruce's connection to Batman. He travels to Wayne Manor with Barbara to interrogate Bruce, who uses his playboy charms to divert suspicion. While leaving the manor, Gordon confesses his affair with Essen to Barbara. Skeevers gets bailed with the help of a hired lawyer but is attacked by Batman shortly after who convinces him to testify against Flass. Skeevers is drugged with rat poison in an assassination attempt, so that he remains silent about the ties between the police force and the mafia, although Skeevers survives after all.

Bruce sneaks into Falcone's manor as Batman and overhears the private conversation between the Roman and his nephew, Johnny Viti. He predicts their intentions to target Gordon's family, so he disguises himself as a motorcyclist to help Gordon. Gordon leaves home on Loeb's orders, but becomes suspicious and turns back only to discover Viti and his men already holding his family hostage. Viti flees the scene with Gordon's infant son. Gordon chases after him on Bruce's motorcycle. The two men end up fighting on a bridge until the baby falls. Bruce catches up in time and leaps over the bridge's railing to save the baby. Gordon thanks Bruce for saving his infant son's life and lets him go. Flass supplies Assistant District Attorney Harvey Dent with the evidence and testimony needed to implicate Loeb, who resigns in disgrace. Gordon is promoted to captain and prepares to meet with Batman to investigate a potential plot orchestrated by a criminal calling himself the Joker.

Reception

Popularity
DC's post-Crisis on Infinite Earths revamp was a major success, raising sales 22% in the first year, and DC beat Marvel in direct market sales for the first time in August and September 1987. The four "Year One" issues were no exception to this. Two years before the relaunch, Batman had all-time low sales of 75,000 copies per month; "Year One" sold an average of 193,000 copies an issue, numbers not seen since the early 1970s. Despite this, it did not outsell other books like Uncanny X-Men, and the collected edition sold well but never matched the sales of The Dark Knight Returns. The story, with the noir-inspired narrative and ultra-violent tone, quickly caught the attention of readers. The Los Angeles Times wrote that "Year One" offered an interesting and entertaining update to the origin of Batman.

Critical response
Year One's characterization of Batman and Gordon, has been praised. Hilary Goldstein (IGN) compared their journey to friendship to the plot of the film Serpico; they found that the two characters' respective story arcs—with Gordon's "illustrat[ing] the corruption in Gotham" and Batman's detailing "the transformation from man to myth"—offered an exploration of Batman's world like no other. Glenn Matchett (ComicsVerse) wrote that, unlike The Dark Knight Returns, Batman in Year One is more vulnerable and inexperienced, which made the story more memorable. Nick Roberts (Geek Syndicate) thought the characters seemed believable, and comics historian Matthew K. Manning called the characterization realistic and grounded.

The story's depiction of Gotham and darker, realistic, mature and more grittier tone and direction, compared to other contemporary Batman comics at the time, has also been acclaimed. Journalist James Lovegrove described "Year One" as a "noir-inflected pulp tale of vigilantism and integrity, focused on a good man doing the right thing in a dirty world" and noted the brutality of the fight sequences. Jason Serafino (Complex) wrote that by ignoring many of Batman's trademark gadgets and villains and focusing in the core essentials of the titular character, Miller managed to present Batman in a relatable and thrilling way, which felt both fresh, unique and reinvigorating, while still being faithful to the spirit of the character. Goldstein found every moment memorable, writing "Miller does not waste a single panel" in presenting a gritty and dark story. Matchett agreed; he offered particular praise for the scenes depicting Batman clashing with the police, calling them the moment Batman began to become a legend.

Mazzucchelli's art was noted as a standout by many, praising the minimalistic, noir-influenced and realistic art-work.

Continuity
Before the New 52 in 2011, Batman: Year One existed in the mainstream DC continuity, and in the same continuity as the other storylines in Miller's "Dark Knight Universe", consisting of The Dark Knight Returns, its sequel The Dark Knight Strikes Again, The Dark Knight III: The Master Race, The Dark Knight Returns: The Last Crusade, Spawn/Batman, and All Star Batman and Robin the Boy Wonder. Following the New 52 reboot, Batman: Zero Year replaced Year One as the official origin for Batman and Year One was relegated to the continuity of the other Frank Miller storylines. However, following the DC Rebirth initiative, elements of "Year One" were gradually returned to the mainstream DC continuity.

After Crisis on Infinite Earths, DC rebooted many of its titles. Year One was followed by Batman: Year Two, but the 1994 Zero Hour: Crisis in Time crossover erased Year Two from continuity. In another continuity re-arrangement, Catwoman: Year One (Catwoman Annual #2, 1995) posited that Selina Kyle had not actually been a prostitute, but, rather, a thief posing as one in order to commit crimes.

Launched in 1989, following the success of the film Batman, the title Batman: Legends of the Dark Knight examines crime-fighting exploits primarily, not exclusively, from the first four to five years of Batman's career. This title rotated in creative teams and time placement, but several stories directly relate to the events of Year One, especially the first arc "Batman: Shaman". In 1996 and 1999, Jeph Loeb and Tim Sale created Batman: The Long Halloween and Batman: Dark Victory, two 13-issue maxiseries that recount Batman's early years as a crime-fighter following the events of Miller's original story and retold the origins of Two-Face and Dick Grayson. The Year One story was continued in the 2005 graphic novel Batman: The Man Who Laughs, following up on Gordon informing Batman about the Joker, and thus recounting their first official encounter. Two other stories, Batman and the Monster Men and Batman and the Mad Monk tie into the same time period of Batman's career, filling in the gap between Year One and the Man Who Laughs. The comics Robin: Year One and Batgirl: Year One describe his sidekicks' origin stories.

Sequels
Two sequels, titled Batman: Year Two and Batman: Year Three, were released in 1987 and 1989.

Adaptations
Joel Schumacher's Batman Forever, although set during another timespan, adopts some elements directly from the graphic novel. Schumacher claims he originally had in mind an adaptation of Frank Miller's Batman: Year One. The studio rejected the idea as they wanted a sequel, not a prequel, though Schumacher was able to include very brief events in Batman's past.

The DC Animated Universe film, Batman: Mask of the Phantasm, adopted elements of the storyline, depicting flashbacks of how Bruce Wayne became Batman and also combines it with elements of Batman: Year Two and shows Batman's personal connection with original character Phantasm inspired by the Reaper, another character in the comics with a connection to Batman.

After the critical failure of Batman & Robin, several attempts were made to reboot the Batman film franchise with an adaptation of Year One. Joss Whedon and Joel Schumacher both pitched their own takes. In 2000, Warner Bros. hired Darren Aronofsky to write and direct Batman: Year One. The film was to be written by Miller, who finished an early draft of the script. The script, however, was a loose adaptation, as it kept most of the themes and elements from the graphic novel but shunned other conventions that were otherwise integral to the character. It was shelved by the studio in 2001, after an individual who claimed to have read Miller's script published a negative review on Ain't It Cool News. In 2016, Miller explained that the film was canceled because of creative differences between him, Aronofsky, and Warner Bros:

In 2005, Christopher Nolan began his series with the reboot film Batman Begins, which draws inspiration from "Year One" and other stories. Batman Begins and its sequel The Dark Knight are set during the same timespan and adopt several elements directly from the graphic novel. Major characters like Commissioner Loeb, Detective Flass and Carmine 'The Roman' Falcone are featured prominently in Batman Begins. Film critic Michael Dodd argued that with each major motion picture focused on the Dark Knight's origins, the odes and references to the Year One comic increased. Comparing Mask of the Phantasm with Batman Begins he noted that "...Phantasm was a Batman story with Year One elements, while Batman Begins was a Year One story with added features". The film's end scene, with Gordon revealing the Joker's arrival in Gotham, mirrors the end of Year One.

In 2011, an animated adaptation was released as a DC Universe Animated Original Movie. It was produced by Bruce Timm, co-directed by Lauren Montgomery and Sam Liu. It features the voices of Benjamin McKenzie as Bruce Wayne/Batman, Bryan Cranston as James Gordon, Eliza Dushku as Selina Kyle/Catwoman, Katee Sackhoff as Sarah Essen, Grey DeLisle as Barbara Gordon, Jon Polito as Commissioner Loeb, Alex Rocco as Carmine 'The Roman' Falcone, and Jeff Bennett as Alfred Pennyworth. The movie premiered at Comic-Con, with a Catwoman short shown in October.

The second half of the fourth season of the Batman-based television series Gotham is inspired by Batman: Year One.

Director Matt Reeves cited Year One as one of the inspirations for The Batman, with Robert Pattinson portraying a younger Bruce Wayne who is in his second year as a crime-fighter.

References

External links
 Batman: Year One movie official site
 Batman: Year One @ The World's Finest
 Current edition at DC Comics 
 Deluxe Hardcover edition at DC Comics 

Batman storylines
Neo-noir comics
Prequel comics
Adultery in comics
Gotham City Police Department
Comics by Frank Miller (comics)
DC Comics adapted into films